Kyawthuite is a rare mineral with a simple formula: Bi3+Sb5+O4. It is a natural bismuth antimonate. Kyawthuite is monoclinic, with space group I2/c, and is isostructural with clinocervantite, its trivalent-antimony-analogue. Kyawthuite is also an antimony-analogue of clinobisvanite. Kyawthuite was discovered in the vicinity of Mogok in Myanmar, an area famous for its variety of gemstone minerals.  Only one sample of the naturally occurring form of this mineral has been found and is stored at the Natural History Museum of Los Angeles County.

References

Bismuth minerals
Antimony minerals
Oxide minerals
Monoclinic minerals